Pete Sampras was the defending champion but did not compete that year.

Greg Rusedski won in the final 6–7(5–7), 2–6, 6–3, 7–5, 6–4 against Nicolas Kiefer.

Seeds

  Yevgeny Kafelnikov (quarterfinals)
  Todd Martin (first round)
  Gustavo Kuerten (first round)
  Tim Henman (first round)
  Greg Rusedski (champion)
  Richard Krajicek (semifinals)
  Nicolas Kiefer (final)
  Nicolás Lapentti (second round)

Draw

Final

Section 1

Section 2

External links
 1999 CA-TennisTrophy draw

Singles